Yelena or Elena Kuzmina may refer to:

Elena Efimovna Kuzmina, Russian archaeologist
Yelena Alexandrovna Kuzmina (1909–1979), Soviet actress